The 2011 World Indoor Lacrosse Championship was the third World Indoor Lacrosse Championship, an international box lacrosse tournament organized by the Federation of International Lacrosse every four years. It took place between 21 and 28 May 2011 in Prague, Czech Republic at the 4,900 seat Eden Arena, an Olympic-sized rink. The Canadian team was the defending champion and for the third time defeated the Iroquois Nationals in the finals, 13–6. The United States defeated the host Czech Republic 16–7 in the bronze medal game.

Pool play
Eight participating teams were placed in two pools. After playing a round-robin, the first place team in each pool advanced to the semi-finals, the second and third placed teams advanced to the quarter-finals, and the fourth place teams advanced to the 7th place games.

Canada cruised through pool play with three easy victories. The Iroquois Nationals beat Ireland and the host Czech Republic by wide margins, but just edged the United States 11–10.

Pool A 

All times are local (UTC+2).

Pool B 

All times are local (UTC+2).

Championship bracket
Goaltender Matt Vinc made 23 saves in the gold medal game, helping Canada to a 13-6 win and earning game MVP honors.

All times are local (UTC+2).

7th place games 

Ireland won 17–15 on aggregate.

Quarter-finals

5th place game

Semi-finals

Bronze medal game

Gold medal game

Ranking, leaders, and awards

Final standings

Scoring leaders

Goaltending leaders

All World Team
Forwards
 Dan Dawson Casey Powell 
Transition
 Cody Jamieson
Defense 
 Sid Smith Kyle Rubisch 
Goaltender
 Matt Vinc
Most Valuable Player
 Casey Powell

Source:

References

External links 
WILC 2011 Results at FIL
Official website

World Indoor Lacrosse Championship, 2011
World Indoor Lacrosse Championship, 2011
Sports competitions in Prague
International lacrosse competitions hosted by the Czech Republic
World Indoor Lacrosse Championship
World Indoor Lacrosse Championship
World Indoor Lacrosse Championship